Jahanabad (also Romanized as Jahānābād) is a village in Dokuheh Rural District, Seh Qaleh District, Sarayan County, South Khorasan Province, Iran. At the 2006 census, its population was 24, in 6 families.

References 

Populated places in Sarayan County